Accidence is a Canadian short drama film, directed by Guy Maddin, Evan Johnson and Galen Johnson, and released in 2018. The film, a continuous nine-minute shot, focuses on an apartment block and depicts the diverse events, both major and minor, taking place on balconies.

The film premiered at the 2018 Berlin Film Festival, as an accompaniment to a screening of his 2017 feature film The Green Fog. It had its North American premiere at the 2018 Toronto International Film Festival.

The film was named to TIFF's annual year-end Canada's Top Ten list for 2018.

References

External links
 

2018 films
Canadian drama short films
Films directed by Guy Maddin
2018 short films
2010s English-language films
2010s Canadian films
Canadian avant-garde and experimental short films